The 1998 Advanta Championships of Philadelphia was a tennis tournament played on indoor carpet courts at the Philadelphia Civic Center in Philadelphia, Pennsylvania in the United States that was part of Tier II of the 1998 WTA Tour. The tournament was held from November 9 through November 15, 1998. Steffi Graf won the singles title and earned $79,000 first-prize money.

Finals

Singles

 Steffi Graf defeated  Lindsay Davenport 4–6, 6–3, 6–4
 It was Graf's 3rd singles title of the year and the 106th of her career.

Doubles

 Elena Likhovtseva /  Ai Sugiyama defeated  Monica Seles /  Natasha Zvereva 7–5, 4–6, 6–2
 It was Likhovtseva's 4th title of the year and the 6th of her career. It was Sugiyama's 6th title of the year and the 10th of her career.

References

External links
 ITF tournament edition details
 Tournament draws

Advanta Championships of Philadelphia
Advanta Championships of Philadelphia
Advanta Championships of Philadelphia
Advanta Championships of Philadelphia
Advanta Championships of Philadelphia